Discocotylidae is a family of flatworms belonging to the order Mazocraeidea.

Genera:
 Allocotylophora Dillon & Hargis, 1965
 Anthocotyle Van Beneden & Hesse, 1863
 Bicotylophora Price, 1936
 Discocotyle Diesing, 1850
 Pseudobicotylophora Amato, 1994
 Pseudodiscocotyla Yamaguti, 1965

References

Polyopisthocotylea
Platyhelminthes families